John Ashmore may refer to:

 John D. Ashmore (1819–1871), American politician
 John Ashmore (translator) (fl. 1621), English translator

See also
Jonathan Ashmore (born 1948), British physicist
Ashmore (disambiguation)